The Skoll Foundation is a private foundation based in Palo Alto, California. The foundation makes grants and investments intended to reduce global poverty. Jeffrey Skoll created the foundation in 1999.

The total assets of the foundation (including its affiliated funds) are $1.127 billion as of the end of 2018. The combined entities made grants totaling about $71 million in 2018 (and disbursements of $56M), based on unaudited numbers reported by the foundation. According to the most recent audited financial statements, the non-grant expenses for the foundation totaled around $17M in 2018.

History
Skoll set up the foundation in 1999 to fund social entrepreneurship through awards, grants and educational programs at Oxford and Harvard Universities.

In late 2003, Skoll established the private Skoll Foundation. The two entities, which have distinct governing bodies but share staff and offices, together operate the foundation's grantmaking and other programs.

In 2001, Skoll hired Sally Osberg, formerly the founding executive director of the Children's Discovery Museum of San Jose. Osberg was the foundation's first employee, president and CEO. Osberg claims that she led the organization through its startup, implementation and renewal phases. Osberg and her colleagues set up platforms to connect civil society members with private and public sector leaders. These platforms included partnerships with Sundance Festival and Oxford's Saïd Business School.

In 2018, Richard Fahey assumed the role of interim president after 14 years of executive leadership at the foundation.

In February 2019, Donald Gips was appointed as the foundation's CEO. Formerly, Gips served as the U.S. Ambassador to the Republic of South Africa.

In March 2021, the foundation hired Marla Blow as its president and chief operating officer. She had formerly served as the senior vice president for social impact in North America for the Mastercard Center for Inclusive Growth.

The foundation, which moved to its Palo Alto headquarters in 2004, also collaborated closely with the Skoll Global Threats Fund, established in 2009, to address climate change, pandemics, water security, nuclear proliferation, and conflict in the Middle East. Some of the fund's initiatives supported by the foundation have included an app, developed in partnership with the Brazilian Ministry of Health, that allowed monitoring of health conditions and potential infection by the Zika virus during the 2016 Olympics; supporting surveillance technologies that identify epidemics at their earliest outbreak; and development of an online tool that will help policymakers identify global water risk and food security hot spots.

The foundation began funding research into pandemic preparedness and prevention in 2009. Simultaneously, the organization funded research into climate change water scarcity, nuclear weapons and conflict in the Middle East; it called this its Global Threats Fund. Previously, the foundation partnered with Google's philanthropic arm, Google.org to fund Nathan Wolfe's 2008 research into cross-species transmission amongst Cameroonian bushmeat hunters. In 2018 the fund created Ending Pandemics, a non-profit spun out from its research into pandemic detection and rapid response.

Skoll increased the foundation's 2020 grant to $200 million to respond to the pandemic's economic, health and social impact. The African Field Epidemiology Network, a group that works with Africa Centres for Disease Control and Prevention were the foundation's first COVID-related grantees. The foundation also gave sixty-four past and current Skoll grantees $50,000 in emergency funding during this period.

Skoll Centre for Social Entrepreneurship at the University of Oxford
In 2003, the foundation donated $7.5M to the Saïd Business School at Oxford University to establish the Skoll Centre for Social Entrepreneurship. The center studies and promotes socially purposed businesses and hosts a one-year MBA programme in social entrepreneurship. The grant also funded an endowed lectureship, program director, visiting fellows, five MBA student fellowships, visiting fellows, and the annual Skoll World Forum on Social Entrepreneurship. The Skoll Centre's activities concentrate on educating social change leaders, practical research and convening leaders in the social change field.

Skoll World Forum
The annual Skoll World Forum assembles social entrepreneurship leaders at the Said Business School at to discuss solutions to social challenges. The foundation held its first forum in 2004. Attendance was roughly 1200 as of the 2019 Forum, and the delegates represented around 80 countries. The event facilitates impact investing.

Notable speakers

The Skoll Awards for Social Entrepreneurship 

Each year, the Skoll Foundation presents the Skoll Awards for Social Entrepreneurship. The foundation accepts nominations from within its network. The following list of Skoll Awards organized by year. Skoll claims the awards are to raise awareness through storytelling. "We felt that part of our mission was to create a ceremony where these folks are given more notoriety.”

See also
Social entrepreneurship
Maryana Iskander
Saïd Business School

References

Further reading 

 Getting Beyond Better: How Social Entrepreneurship Works by Sally R. Osberg and Roger L. Martin. Harvard Business Review Press, 2015.
 Wish You Happy Forever: What China's Orphans Taught Me about Moving Mountains by Jenny Bowen. HarperCollins Publishers, 2014.
 However Long the Night: Molly Melching's Journey to Help Millions of African Women and Girls Triumph by Aimee Molloy. HarperCollins Publishers, 2014.
 The Business of Good: Social Entrepreneurship and the New Bottom Line by Jason Haber. Entrepreneur Press, 2016.
 Anne-Marie Slaughter, "Social Entrepreneurs can give the government a lift," Financial Times May 77, 2016, retrieved 2017-02-17 at https://www.ft.com/content/1172995c-1b79-11e6-b286-cddde55ca122
 "Al Gore is hugely optimistic when it comes to one thing about climate change," Quartz,  April 15, 2016, https://qz.com/662233/al-gore-is-hugely-optimistic-when-it-comes-to-one-thing-about-climate-change/
 Sebastien Turbot, "The Web connects me to the world, but conferences unite me with my tribe,"  Entrepreneur, April 11, 2016, https://www.entrepreneur.com/article/273162
 Adva Saldinger, "Mary Robinson on Climate and Development," Devex, April 26, 2016, https://www.devex.com/news/mary-robinson-on-climate-and-development-88081
 Jason Haber, "Meet the new breed of philanthropists helping social entrepreneurs succeed," Entrepreneur, June 30, 2016; retrieved 2017-02-17 at https://www.entrepreneur.com/article/274859

External links 
 
 List of Skoll Awardees
 Skoll Global Threats Fund

Development charities based in the United States
Foundations based in the United States
Non-profit organizations based in California
Social entrepreneurship
Social welfare charities based in the United States
Organizations based in Palo Alto, California
Organizations established in 1999
1999 establishments in California